LLK may refer to:

Lollipop Lust Kill, American band
Lankaran International Airport (IATA code: LLK)